The 2020 Paris–Nice was a road cycling stage race that was held between 8 and 14 March 2020 in France. It was the 78th edition of Paris–Nice and the fifth race of the 2020 UCI World Tour. The race was shortened on 13 March, removing the final stage, due to concerns over the COVID-19 pandemic. The global health situation had already led to the withdrawal of several teams before and during the race.

German rider Maximilian Schachmann won the overall classification after the race was ended following the seventh stage. Belgian Tiesj Benoot was second, Colombian Sergio Higuita third.

Teams
Seventeen teams participated in the race, including twelve UCI WorldTour teams and five UCI Professional Continental teams. As a result, of the 136 riders who started the race, only 61 riders finished.

UCI WorldTeams

 
 
 
 
 
 
 
 
 
 
 
 

UCI Professional Continental teams

Route

Stages

Stage 1
8 March 2020 — Plaisir to Plaisir,

Stage 2
9 March 2020 — Chevreuse to Chalette-sur-Loing,

Stage 3
10 March 2020 — Chalette-sur-Loing to La Châtre,

Stage 4
11 March 2020 — Saint-Amand-Montrond to Saint-Amand-Montrond,  (ITT)

Stage 5
12 March 2020 — Gannat to La Côte-Saint-André,

Stage 6
13 March 2020 — Sorgues to Apt, 

 withdrew before the start of stage 6, following concerns surrounding the COVID-19 pandemic.

Stage 7

14 March 2020 — Nice to Valdeblore La Colmiane,

Stage 8 (cancelled)
15 March 2020 — Nice to Nice, 

Following stage 5, the decision was made to cancel stage 8 in order to limit the exposure of staff and riders during the COVID-19 pandemic.

Classification leadership table

Final classification standings

General classification

Points classification

Mountains classification

Young rider classification

Teams classification

Notes

References

2020
2020 UCI World Tour
2020 in French sport
March 2020 sports events in France
Sports events curtailed due to the COVID-19 pandemic